David John Llewellyn (born 9 August 1949) is a Welsh former professional footballer who played in the Football League for Mansfield Town, Peterborough United and West Ham United.

References

1949 births
Living people
Welsh footballers
Association football forwards
English Football League players
West Ham United F.C. players
Peterborough United F.C. players
Mansfield Town F.C. players